The Battle of Lahore took place in December 1764 near Lahore, between the Durranis and the Sikh Misls as part of the Afghan-Sikh wars which ended indecisively with both parties retiring due to nightfall.

Background
Ahmad Shah Abdali marched his seventh campaign into India after hearing reports about the Sikh triumphs, with 18,000 Afghans and adding another 12,000 soldiers under the chief of Qalat, Nasir Khan Baluch. When the united army marched from Eminabad to Lahore, the team of Durrani scouts or advance guards (Qarawal), commanded by Gahram Khan Magasi and Ahmad Khan Balidi, were attacked near Lahore by the Sikhs, commanded by Charat Singh where both Ahmad Shah and his son were killed. After Abdali was informed about the attack, he immediately had Nasir Khan and Mir Abdul Nabi Keisani, march with armies from all sides to assist the scout party.

Battle
A long furious and bitter battle took place where both the Afghans and the Sikhs fought with equal intensity. In the melee, a Sikh shot down Nasir Khan's horse with Khan falling down, causing panic among his soldiers, and Nur Muhammad barely making an escape. Nasir Khan was saved and rescued by his servants Muhammad Husain and Mir Mangah after shooting down the Sikh and his horse dead. According to historian Hari Ram Gupta and Ganda Singh, the battle ended at night fall with retirement of both parties. Qazi Nur Muhammad who was brought along by Ahmad Shah Abdali to write down accounts of his master's campaign, compiled as Jang Namah, written in poetry of Persian verses,  praised the bravery of Mazhar Mohammad, Ghulam Husain Bangalzei, Bahadur Sasuli, Mir Barfi, Fatuhi Darogha and Mulla Dar.

Aftermath
After the retirement of both parties at nightfall, the Sikhs moved to Amritsar, also known as Chak Guru or Guru Chak and when Ahmad Shah Abdali was notified about the movement of the Sikhs, he marched towards Amritsar with Nasir Khan and the united army, but upon reaching the town, they didn't find anyone except for 30 Sikhs who came out of their religious temple and were killed in a close combat after fearlessly fighting against 1000s of Afghans and Baluchis in Battle of Darbar Sahib (1764).

References 

Battles involving the Durrani Empire
Battles involving the Sikhs